Urif is a Palestinian village in the Nablus Governorate in northern West Bank, located 13 kilometers (8 miles) south of Nablus. According to the Palestinian Central Bureau of Statistics (PCBS), the town had a population of 2,839 inhabitants in mid-year 2006.

Location
‘Urif is located 7.6km south of Nablus. It is bordered by ‘Einabus to the east, ‘Asira al Qibliya to the north, and Jamma’in to the west and south.

History
Ceramics from the late Roman  have been found here. Dauphin writes that ceramics from the  Byzantine era also have been found, but Ellenblum writes that no pottery from  that era has been found here.

Crusader period
A woman of Dayr Urif, Sa'ida, was wed to Ahmad ibn Khalid ibn Qudama, a jurist and leader of Hanbali villagers in the Nablus area who fled from Crusader rule to Damascus between 1156 and 1173. Ahmad's grandson Diya al-Din (1173-1245) refers to the presence of Muslims in Urif during his lifetime.

Ottoman era
Urif was incorporated into the Ottoman Empire in 1517 with all of  Palestine, and in 1596 it appeared in the tax registers as being in the nahiya (subdistrict) of Jabal Qubal of the liwa (district) of Nablus. It was noted as hali, empty, but a fixed tax rate of 33.3% was paid on various agricultural products, such as wheat, barley, summer crops, olive trees, goats and/or beehives, in addition to "occasional revenues"; a total of 2,800 akçe.

In 1838 Urif was noted as a Muslim village, part of the Jurat Merda subdistrict, located south of Nablus. In 1870, Victor Guérin found the village to occupy the top of a hill, and having about 450 inhabitants. In 1882, the PEF's Survey of Western Palestine (SWP) described  Urif as: "A stone village, on high ground, with a few olives; supplied by wells and with a small spring to the east."

British Mandate era
In the 1922 census of Palestine conducted by the British Mandate authorities, Urif had a population of 270 Muslims, increasing  in the 1931 census to 403;  402 Muslims and 1 Christian, in 103 houses.

In the 1945 statistics the population was 520, all Muslims,  while the total land area was 3,965 dunams, according to an official land and population survey. 
Of this, 1,107 dunams were for plantations and irrigable land, 1,452 for cereals, while 32 dunams were classified as built-up areas.

Jordanian period
In the wake of the 1948 Arab–Israeli War, and after the 1949 Armistice Agreements,  Urif came  under Jordanian rule. The Jordanian census of 1961 found 710 inhabitants.

Post 1967
Since the Six-Day War in 1967, Urif has been under Israeli occupation.  As of 2014,  3,115 dunams (77%) of Urif land were   Area B, while 949 (23%) were   Area C. 58 dunums of Urif's land have been confiscated for the Israeli settlement of Yitzhar.

Chronology of events and disturbances
On May 19, 2012, about 25 Jewish settlers, some of them carrying guns, set fire to the wheat fields of Urif, and shot one Palestinian man in the stomach.  
On May 26, 2012, settlers from  Yitzhar shot  a youth from Urif. They then tied him up and proceeded to beat him. Samaria Regional Council head Gershon Mesika said that the shooting was a defensive act against a man who wielded a knife. The clash had started when a group of settlers were thought to have set fire to fields belonging to Urif, although the settlers denied any involvement.
In 2013, settlers from Yitzhar reportedly smashed the window of a mosque in Urif and tried to burn it down.
In February, 2015, settlers from Yitzhar defaced the village school with graffiti, with 'Death to Arabs' sprayed alongside the Star of David in an alleged price tag attacks.
In July 2016, the IDF confiscated in Urif homemade weapons and ammunition, and lathes used to manufacture weapons, as well as apprehending four local Arab residents of Urif who sold such weapons. 
In 2017, farmers from Urif were prevented from working on their land in Area B.
In May, 2021, as part of the 2021 demonstrations;  Nidal Sael Safadi  was killed in Urif by the Israeli army, while "trying to confront Israeli settlers who were storming the area".

References

Bibliography

External links
Welcome To 'Urif
 Urif
Survey of Western Palestine, Map 14:  IAA,  Wikimedia commons
 ‘Urif Village Profile,  Applied Research Institute–Jerusalem (ARIJ)
 Development Priorities and Needs in ‘Urif, ARIJ
Setting 22 Dunums of Agricultural Lands Ablaze in Urif village -Nablus Governorate, POICA, April 30, 2013

Nablus Governorate
Villages in the West Bank
Municipalities of the State of Palestine